Lyceum is an album by The Orchids, released on Sarah Records in 1989.

It was the first album release by the group (and also by the label) and was originally only available as an 8 track, 10" mini-album on vinyl. As was usual for albums on Sarah Records, no singles were released from it, although the later 2005 reissue contained all the early singles.

It was reviewed in Melody Maker as "Another fountainhead of unqualified greatness".

Track listing
"It's Only Obvious"  
"A Place Called Home"  
"Caveman"  
"York Song"  
"Carrole-Anne"  
"Hold On"  
"Blue Light"  
"If You Can't Find Love"

2005 re-issue
"It's Only Obvious"
"A Place Called Home"  
"Caveman"  
"York Song"  
"Carrole-Anne"  
"Hold On"  
"Blue Light"  
"If You Can't Find Love"
"I've Got a Habit"  – First single on Sarah Records, 1988
"Apologies"  – Single B-side
"Give Me Some Peppermint Freedom" - from Shadow Factory compilation, Sarah Records 1989
"Defy the Law "  - From "Underneath the Window" EP, Sarah Records 1988
"Underneath the Window, Underneath the Sink"  - From "Underneath the Window" EP
"Tiny Words" - From "Underneath the Window" EP
"Walter" - From "Underneath the Window" EP
"What Will We Do Next" - What Will We Do Next Single A-side Sarah Records 1989
"As Times Goes By" - What Will We Do Next Single B-side 
"Yawn" - What Will We Do Next Single B-side 
"Ill Wind That Blows" -  7" A-side, Caff 1990
"All Those Things" -  7" B-side, Caff 1990

1989 albums
The Orchids albums
Sarah Records albums